The 1971–72 Connecticut Huskies men's basketball team represented the University of Connecticut in the 1971–72 collegiate men's basketball season. The Huskies completed the season with an 8–17 overall record. The Huskies were members of the Yankee Conference, where they ended the season with a 5–5 record. The Huskies played their home games at Hugh S. Greer Field House in Storrs, Connecticut, and were led by third-year head coach Dee Rowe.

Schedule 

|-
!colspan=12 style=""| Regular Season

Schedule Source:

References 

UConn Huskies men's basketball seasons
Connecticut
1971 in sports in Connecticut
1972 in sports in Connecticut